Nathan Leslie McCullum (born 1 September 1980) is a former New Zealand international cricketer, who represented the New Zealand cricket team in One Day Internationals and Twenty20 Internationals. He has represented New Zealand in six T20 World Cup tournaments in 2007, 2009, 2010, 2012, 2014 and 2016. He also played football and was regarded as a prolific striker.

A right hand lower-order batsman and right arm off break bowler, he is a member of the Otago Volts, competing in the State Championship, State Shield and State Twenty20 competitions.

He retired from international cricket after 2016 ICC World Twenty20.

Personal life
McCullum is the son of former Otago representative Stuart McCullum and the older brother of current Otago and former New Zealand international cricketer and captain Brendon McCullum wicket keeper batsmen. He and Brendon attended King's High School. He had enjoyed a carefree childhood like his younger brother Brendon.

McCullum is married and he is father of 3 boys (born 2010, 2012 and 2014), and has moved up to Auckland to work part-time as a construction recruitment agent. He became a general manager of Total Property Vorx which is a construction firm in Auckland. He was also invited by the New Zealand consulate in Dubai in order to promote the country's pavilion for Expo 2020. Nathan specialised in the field of industrial and commercial construction including land building maintenance and office refurbishment.

Domestic career
McCullum made his first class debut for Otago in the 1999–2000 season. His first List A match came in the 2000–01 season and his first Twenty20 domestic match was against Canterbury at Christchurch on 13 January 2006. Later that year, McCullum was selected as part of the 30-man preliminary squad for the 2006 ICC Champions Trophy alongside fellow Otago teammates Warren McSkimming and Bradley Scott but ultimately missed out on the final squad. In 2007, he toured the Netherlands and served as a player-coach for Hermes Cricket Club taking charge of the age group and main team.

McCullum is building a reputation as a travelling Twenty 20 player, having played in Twenty 20 tournaments since 2010 for Lancashire, Pune Warriors India, Sunrisers Hyderabad, Sydney Sixers and Glamorgan as well as still turning out for his native side Otago. In 2010, he was signed up by Lancashire replacing Shoaib Malik as its overseas player for Friends Provident T20.

He was picked by Sydney Sixers for the 2011–12 Big Bash League season. He was also part of the Sydney Sixers team which won the 2012 Champions League T20 and he played a crucial role with the ball in the final picking up 3/24 in the final against the Highveld Lions. He was picked by Glamorgan side as an injury replacement for Dirk Nannes for the 2013 Friends Life T20 and he was also the second overseas player to play for Glamorgan during the tournament.

International career
He made his Twenty20 International debut for New Zealand against South Africa on 19 September 2007 at the inaugural edition of the Twenty20 World Cup in South Africa. However, he was dropped from the team after his T20I debut and worked harder with Mike Hesson in order to get back into the New Zealand team. He was also omitted from the 2009 ICC Champions Trophy.

He made his One Day International debut against Sri Lanka on 8 September 2009 at the age of 27 in Colombo. It marked his comeback return to the national team after a gap of two years. Although never playing test cricket, he has been a valuable asset in the shorter forms of the game, particularly in the 2011 Cricket World Cup in the sub-continent, where New Zealand ended up in semi finals. In February 2011, he was ruled out of New Zealand's opening match against Kenya after being hospitalised due to high fever. He played a key role in the quarterfinal match against South Africa Africa the 2011 World Cup where he took 3/24 in a low scoring match defending 221.

Although, Nathan was a regular feature in New Zealand's limited overs side since 2010s, his opportunities were often hampered at times due to the presence of Daniel Vettori who served as the lead spinner for New Zealand for a long time.

In an ODI against Sri Lanka at Hambantota in 2013, Nathan McCullum smashed 22 runs off spinner Rangana Herath's final over of the match when New Zealand required 21 in the last over. His match winning knock of unbeaten 32 off just nine deliveries including three sixes and one four in the penultimate over secured New Zealand a victory in a tense close rain curtailed match. He was also part of the New Zealand squad at the 2013 ICC Champions Trophy and in a group stage match against hosts England during the tournament, he set the record for taking the most number of catches in a Champions Trophy match with four. During the 2013 Champions Trophy, he also played a pivotal role in New Zealand's only win in the tournament scoring crucial 32 off 42 balls against Sri Lanka in a low scoring match where New Zealand won by one wicket chasing 139.

Although he was named in the final squad of 15 in 2015 Cricket World Cup, he was mostly used as a substitute fielder to Daniel Vettori. In 2015, McCullum announced he will retire from all forms of cricket at the end on the 2015/16 Southern Hemisphere summer season. He was not named in the Sri Lankan ODI series due to his back issues, so his ODI career is over, but he was named in the 2016 ICC World Twenty20. His last international match was against Bangladesh on 26 March 2016. He got out for first ball nought for Mustafizur Rahman as his fifth victim for T20I fifer. However, in bowling, McCullum took the wicket of Sabbir Rahman, which was his last international wicket as well. New Zealand finally won the match by 75 runs.

His brother, Brendon McCullum also announced he would only retire from international cricket at the end on the 2015/16 Southern Hemisphere summer season.

Football
Prior to concentrating on his cricketing career, McCullum played as a striker for Caversham AFC, winning the team's golden boot award in 1999 by scoring 19 goals in the FootballSouth Premier League. He scored two goals for the club in the 2003 New Zealand National Soccer League, at that time New Zealand's premier club league competition. He left the club in 2004, playing briefly with Mosgiel before turning his sporting attention completely to cricket. In 2017, he debuted for Auckland division 2 team, Ellerslie Diamonds, pulling his hamstring within minutes.

Career best performances
as of 26 March 2016

References

External links

Nathan L McCullum at the New Zealand Cricket Players Association

New Zealand cricketers
New Zealand One Day International cricketers
New Zealand Twenty20 International cricketers
New Zealand association footballers
New Zealand expatriate sportspeople in England
New Zealand expatriate sportspeople in Australia
Otago cricketers
1980 births
Living people
Pune Warriors India cricketers
Cricketers at the 2007 Cricket World Cup
Cricketers at the 2011 Cricket World Cup
Cricketers at the 2015 Cricket World Cup
Saint Lucia Kings cricketers
Sydney Sixers cricketers
Glamorgan cricketers
People educated at King's High School, Dunedin
Quetta Gladiators cricketers
Lancashire cricketers
Cricketers from Dunedin
Association footballers from Dunedin
Association football forwards
South Island cricketers
Caversham AFC players